This is a list of all cartoons featuring Porky Pig. Directors are listed in parentheses.

Porky Pig shorts

1935
 I Haven't Got a Hat (March 2, 1935) - "Merrie Melodies" series, Porky's first appearance (Friz Freleng)
 Country Mouse (July 13, 1935) - "Merrie Melodies" series, cameo appearance (Friz Freleng)
 Hollywood Capers (October 19, 1935) - "Beans" series, cameo appearance (Jack King)
 Gold Diggers of '49 (November 2, 1935) - "Beans" series, Beans, instead of Porky, ends the cartoon by saying "That's all folks!" (Tex Avery)

1936
 Alpine Antics (January 18, 1936) - "Beans" series (Jack King)
 The Phantom Ship (February 1, 1936) - "Beans" series, cameo appearance (Jack King)
 Boom Boom (February 29, 1936) - "Beans" series (Jack King)
 The Blow Out, First short without Beans the Cat (April 4, 1936) (Tex Avery)
 Westward Whoa, Last paring with Beans the Cat (April 25, 1936) (Jack King)
 Plane Dippy (April 30th, 1936) (Tex Avery)
 Fish Tales (May 23, 1936) (Jack King)
 Shanghaied Shipmates (June 20, 1936) (Jack King)
 Porky's Pet (July 11, 1936) (Jack King)
 Porky the Rain-Maker (August 1, 1936) (Tex Avery)
 Porky's Poultry Plant (August 22, 1936) (Frank Tashlin)
 Porky's Moving Day (September 12, 1936) (Jack King)
 Milk and Money (October 3, 1936) (Tex Avery)
 Boulevardier from the Bronx (October 10, 1936) - "Merrie Melodies" series, cameo appearance (Friz Freleng)
 Little Beau Porky (November 14, 1936) (Frank Tashlin)
 The Village Smithy (December 5, 1936) (Tex Avery)
 Porky in the North Woods (December 19, 1936) (Frank Tashlin)

1937

 Porky the Wrestler (January 9, 1937) (Tex Avery)
 Porky's Road Race (February 6, 1937) (Frank Tashlin)
 Picador Porky (February 27, 1937) - This is the first short featuring Mel Blanc, who plays the bull. (Tex Avery)
 Porky's Romance (April 3, 1937) - The last time Joe Dougherty voiced Porky, first appearance of Petunia Pig. (Frank Tashlin)
 Porky's Duck Hunt (April 17, 1937) - This is the first short in which Porky was voiced by Mel Blanc; the first appearance of Daffy Duck; and the first cartoon of Porky with the current design. (Tex Avery)
 Porky and Gabby (May 15, 1937) - first appearance of Gabby Goat (Ub Iwerks)
 Porky's Building (June 19, 1937) (Frank Tashlin)
 Porky's Super Service (July 3, 1937) (Ub Iwerks)
 Porky's Badtime Story (July 24, 1937) (Bob Clampett)
 Porky's Railroad (August 7, 1937) (Frank Tashlin)
 Get Rich Quick Porky (August 28, 1937) - final appearance of Gabby Goat (Bob Clampett)
 Porky's Garden (September 11, 1937) (Tex Avery)
 Rover's Rival (October 2, 1937) - first Looney Tunes cartoon with Porky Pig's drum ending. (Bob Clampett)
 The Case of the Stuttering Pig (October 30, 1937) (Frank Tashlin)
 Porky's Double Trouble (November 13, 1937) - final "Fat Porky" cartoon. (Frank Tashlin)
 Porky's Hero Agency (December 4, 1937) (Bob Clampett)

1938
 Porky's Poppa (January 15, 1938) (Bob Clampett)
 Porky at the Crocadero (February 5, 1938) (Frank Tashlin)
 What Price Porky (February 26, 1938) - With Daffy Duck (Bob Clampett)
 Porky's Phoney Express (March 19, 1938) (Cal Howard, Cal Dalton)
 Porky's Five & Ten (April 16, 1938) (Bob Clampett)
 Porky's Hare Hunt (April 30, 1938) - First appearance of a prototypical yet unnamed Bugs Bunny (Ben Hardaway, Cal Dalton)
 Injun Trouble (May 21, 1938) (Bob Clampett)
 Porky the Fireman (June 4, 1938) (Frank Tashlin)
 Porky's Party (June 25, 1938) (Bob Clampett)
 Porky's Spring Planting (July 25, 1938) (Frank Tashlin)
 Porky & Daffy (August 6, 1938) - With Daffy Duck (Bob Clampett)
 Wholly Smoke (August 27, 1938) (Frank Tashlin)
 Porky in Wackyland (September 24, 1938) (Bob Clampett)
 Porky's Naughty Nephew (October 15, 1938) - First appearance of Cicero Pig (called "Pinkie" in his two cartoon appearances). (Bob Clampett)
 Porky in Egypt (November 5, 1938) (Bob Clampett)
 The Daffy Doc (November 26, 1938)  (Bob Clampett)
 Porky the Gob (December 17, 1938) (Ben Hardaway, Cal Dalton)

1939
 The Lone Stranger and Porky (January 7, 1939) (Bob Clampett)
 It's an Ill Wind (January 28, 1939) (Ben Hardaway, Cal Dalton)
 Porky's Tire Trouble (February 18, 1939) (Bob Clampett)
 Porky's Movie Mystery (March 11, 1939) (Bob Clampett)
 Chicken Jitters (April 1, 1939) (Bob Clampett)
 Porky and Teabiscuit (April 29, 1939) (Ben Hardaway, Cal Dalton)
 Kristopher Kolumbus Jr. (May 13, 1939) (Bob Clampett)
 Polar Pals (June 3, 1939) (Bob Clampett)
 Scalp Trouble (June 24, 1939) - With Daffy Duck (Bob Clampett)
 Old Glory (July 1, 1939) - first Porky Pig cartoon made in color (Chuck Jones)
 Porky's Picnic (July 15, 1939) (Bob Clampett)
 Wise Quacks (August 5, 1939) - With Daffy Duck (Bob Clampett)
 Hare-um Scare-um (August 12, 1939) - "Merrie Melodies" series, cameo appearance on a poster (Ben Hardaway, Cal Dalton)
 Porky's Hotel (September 2, 1939) (Bob Clampett)
 Jeepers Creepers (September 23, 1939) (Bob Clampett)
 Naughty Neighbors (October 7, 1939) - Brief cameo appearance of Daffy Duck (Bob Clampett)
 Pied Piper Porky (November 4, 1939) (Bob Clampett)
 Porky the Giant Killer (November 18, 1939) (Ben Hardaway, Cal Dalton)
 Sniffles and the Bookworm (December 2, 1939) - cameo appearance in books (Chuck Jones)
 The Film Fan (December 16, 1939) (Bob Clampett)

1940
 Porky's Last Stand (January 6, 1940) - With Daffy Duck (Bob Clampett)
 Africa Squeaks (January 27, 1940) (Bob Clampett)
 Ali-Baba Bound (February 10, 1940) - public domain (Bob Clampett)
 Pilgrim Porky (March 16, 1940) (Bob Clampett)
 Slap Happy Pappy (April 13, 1940) (Bob Clampett)
 Porky's Poor Fish (April 27, 1940) (Bob Clampett)
 You Ought to Be in Pictures (May 18, 1940) - With Daffy Duck (Friz Freleng) 
 The Chewin' Bruin (June 8, 1940) (Bob Clampett)
 Porky's Baseball Broadcast (July 6, 1940) (Friz Freleng)
 Patient Porky (August 24, 1940) (Bob Clampett)
 Calling Dr. Porky (September 21, 1940) (Friz Freleng)
 Prehistoric Porky (October 12, 1940) (Bob Clampett)
 The Sour Puss (November 2, 1940) (Bob Clampett)
 Porky's Hired Hand (November 30, 1940) (Friz Freleng)
 The Timid Toreador (December 21, 1940) (Bob Clampett, Norm McCabe)

1941
 Porky's Snooze Reel (January 11, 1941) (Bob Clampett, Norm McCabe)
 Porky's Bear Facts (March 29, 1941) (Friz Freleng)
 Toy Trouble (April 12, 1941) - "Sniffles" series, cameo appearance as toys (Chuck Jones)
 Porky's Preview (April 19, 1941) (Tex Avery)
 Porky's Ant (May 10, 1941) (Chuck Jones)
 A Coy Decoy (June 7, 1941) - "Daffy Duck" series (Bob Clampett)
 Porky's Prize Pony (June 21, 1941) (Chuck Jones)
 Meet John Doughboy (July 5, 1941) - WWII propaganda film (Bob Clampett)
 We, the Animals - Squeak! (August 9, 1941) (Bob Clampett)
 The Henpecked Duck (August 30, 1941) - "Daffy Duck" series (Bob Clampett)
 Notes to You (September 20, 1941) (Friz Freleng)
 Robinson Crusoe Jr. (October 25, 1941) - first "Porky Pig" cartoon directed solely by Norman McCabe
 Porky's Midnight Matinee (November 22, 1941) (Chuck Jones)
 Porky's Pooch (December 27, 1941) (Bob Clampett)

1942
 Porky's Pastry Pirates (January 17, 1942) (Friz Freleng)
 Who's Who in the Zoo (February 14, 1942) (Norm McCabe)
 Porky's Cafe (February 21, 1942) (Chuck Jones)
 Any Bonds Today? (April 2, 1942) - Film used to film bonds during World War II, cameo with "Elmer Fudd", "Bugs Bunny" series (Bob Clampett)
 My Favorite Duck (December 5, 1942) "Daffy Duck" series (Chuck Jones)

1943
 Confusions of a Nutzy Spy (January 23, 1943) - WWII propaganda film (Norm McCabe)
 Yankee Doodle Daffy (June 5, 1943) - "Daffy Duck" series (Friz Freleng)
 Porky Pig's Feat (July 17, 1943) -  (Frank Tashlin) last short in b&w
 A Corny Concerto (September 18, 1943) - "Merrie Melodies" series; this short contains several of the future stars for Warner Brothers (Bob Clampett)
 An Itch in Time (December 4, 1943) - "Merrie Melodies" series, cameo appearance on a comic book (Bob Clampett)

1944
 Tom Turk and Daffy (February 12, 1944) - "Daffy Duck" series (Chuck Jones)
 Tick Tock Tuckered (April 8, 1944) - Slightly revamped colorized version of Porky's Badtime Story; "Daffy Duck" series (Bob Clampett)
 Swooner Crooner (May 6, 1944) - "Looney Tunes" series (Frank Tashlin)
 Duck Soup to Nuts (May 27, 1944) - "Daffy Duck" series (Friz Freleng)
 Slightly Daffy (June 17, 1944) - Color remake of Scalp Trouble; "Daffy Duck" series (Friz Freleng)
 Brother Brat (July 15, 1944) - only "Porky" cartoon of 1944 (Frank Tashlin)

1945
 Trap Happy Porky (February 24, 1945) (Chuck Jones)
 Wagon Heels (July 28, 1945) (slightly revamped colorized version of Injun Trouble) (Bob Clampett)

1946
 Book Revue (January 5, 1946) - "Daffy Duck" series, cameo appearance on comic book (Bob Clampett)
 Baby Bottleneck (March 16, 1946) - "Daffy Duck" series (Bob Clampett)
 Daffy Doodles (April 6, 1946) - "Daffy Duck" series (Robert McKimson)
 Kitty Kornered (June 8, 1946) (Bob Clampett)
 The Great Piggy Bank Robbery (July 20, 1946) - "Daffy Duck" series, cameo appearance (Bob Clampett)
 Mouse Menace (November 2, 1946) (Arthur Davis)

1947
 One Meat Brawl (January 18, 1947) - only "Porky" cartoon of 1947 (Robert McKimson)
 Little Orphan Airedale (October 4, 1947) - "Charlie Dog" series (Chuck Jones)

1948
 Daffy Duck Slept Here (March 6, 1948) - "Daffy Duck" series (Robert McKimson)
 Nothing but the Tooth (May 1, 1948) (Arthur Davis)
 The Pest That Came to Dinner (September 11, 1948) (Arthur Davis)
 Riff Raffy Daffy (November 27, 1948) - "Daffy Duck" series (Arthur Davis)
 Scaredy Cat - "Sylvester" series (December 18, 1948) (Chuck Jones)

1949
 Awful Orphan (January 29, 1949) - "Charlie Dog" series (Chuck Jones)
 Porky Chops (February 12, 1949) (Arthur Davis)
 Paying the Piper (March 12, 1949) (Robert McKimson)
 Daffy Duck Hunt (March 26, 1949) - "Daffy Duck" series (Robert McKimson)
 Curtain Razor (May 21, 1949) (Friz Freleng)
 Often an Orphan (August 13, 1949) - Final appearance of Porky in the "Charlie Dog" series (Chuck Jones)
 Dough for the Do-Do (September 2, 1949) (slightly revamped colorized version of Porky in Wackyland) (Friz Freleng)
 Bye, Bye Bluebeard (October 21, 1949) (Arthur Davis)

1950
 Boobs in the Woods (January 28, 1950) - "Daffy Duck" series (Robert McKimson)
 The Scarlet Pumpernickel (March 4, 1950) - "Daffy Duck" series (Chuck Jones)
 An Egg Scramble (May 27, 1950) (Robert McKimson)
 Golden Yeggs (August 5, 1950) - "Daffy Duck" series (Friz Freleng)
 The Ducksters (September 2, 1950) - "Daffy Duck" series (Chuck Jones)
 Dog Collared (December 2, 1950) (Robert McKimson)

1951
 The Wearing of the Grin (July 14, 1951) (Chuck Jones)
 Drip-Along Daffy (November 17, 1951) - "Daffy Duck" series (Chuck Jones)
 The Prize Pest (December 22, 1951) - "Daffy Duck" series (Robert McKimson)

1952
All of Porky's appearances between 1952 and 1953 form part of the "Daffy Duck" series
 Thumb Fun (March 1, 1952) (Robert McKimson)
 Cracked Quack (July 5, 1952) (Friz Freleng)
 Fool Coverage (December 13, 1952) (Robert McKimson)

1953
 Duck Dodgers in the 24½th Century (July 25, 1953) (Chuck Jones)

1954
 Claws for Alarm (May 22, 1954) - "Sylvester" series (Chuck Jones)
 My Little Duckaroo (November 27, 1954) - "Daffy Duck" series (Chuck Jones)

1955
 Jumpin' Jupiter (August 6, 1955) - "Sylvester" series (Chuck Jones)
 Dime to Retire (September 3, 1955) - “Daffy Duck” series (Robert McKimson)

1956
All remaining cartoons during the golden era featuring Porky (except the 1964 Bugs Bunny and Yosemite Sam cartoon Dumb Patrol) form part of the "Daffy Duck" series
 Rocket Squad (March 10, 1956) (Chuck Jones)
 Deduce, You Say! (September 29, 1956) (Chuck Jones)

1957
 Boston Quackie (June 22, 1957) (Robert McKimson)

1958
 Robin Hood Daffy (March 8, 1958) (Chuck Jones)

1959
 China Jones (February 14, 1959) (Robert McKimson)

1961
 Daffy's Inn Trouble (September 23, 1961) (Robert McKimson)

1964
 Dumb Patrol (January 18, 1964), cameo, with Bugs Bunny and Yosemite Sam (Gerry Chiniquy)

1965
 Corn on the Cop (July 24, 1965) (Irv Spector)

1966
 Mucho Locos (February 5, 1966), cameo, with Speedy Gonzales (Robert McKimson) appears in archival footage of Robin Hood Daffy (1958)

Post-Golden age cartoons and films

1972
 Daffy Duck and Porky Pig Meet the Groovie Goolies (TV special)

1976
 Bugs and Daffy's Carnival of the Animals (TV special)

1977
 Bugs Bunny in Space (TV special)
 Bugs Bunny's Easter Special (TV special)

1978
 How Bugs Bunny Won the West (TV special)
 A Connecticut Rabbit in King Arthur's Court (TV special)
 Bugs Bunny's Howl-oween Special (TV special)

1979
 The Bugs Bunny/Road Runner Movie
 Bugs Bunny's Thanksgiving Diet (TV special)
 Bugs Bunny's Looney Christmas Tales (TV special)

1980
 The Bugs Bunny Mystery Special (TV special)
 Duck Dodgers and the Return of the 24½th Century - "Daffy Duck" series (part of the TV special Daffy Duck's Thanks-For-Giving Special).

1981
 Bugs Bunny: All-American Hero (TV special)
 The Looney Looney Looney Bugs Bunny Movie

1982
 Bugs Bunny's Mad World of Television (TV special)
 Bugs Bunny's 3rd Movie: 1001 Rabbit Tales

1983
 Daffy Duck's Fantastic Island

1988
 Who Framed Roger Rabbit
 Daffy Duck's Quackbusters
 Bugs vs. Daffy: Battle of the Music Video Stars (TV special); last time Porky was voiced by Mel Blanc.

1990
 The Earth Day Special (TV special); first time Porky was voiced by Jeff Bergman.
 Happy Birthday, Bugs!: 50 Looney Years (TV special); voiced by Jeff Bergman.
 Gremlins 2: The New Batch; voiced by Jeff Bergman.
 Tiny Toon Adventures (TV series; 1990–1995); first time Porky voiced by Bob Bergen, Noel Blanc, Joe Alaskey, and Greg Burson.

1991
 Bugs Bunny's Overtures to Disaster (TV special); voiced by Jeff Bergman.

1992
 Invasion of the Bunny Snatchers - "Bugs Bunny" series; voiced by Jeff Bergman.

1993
 Animaniacs (TV series; 1993–1998); voiced by Rob Paulsen and Greg Burson.

1995
 Carrotblanca - "Bugs Bunny" series, cameo

1996
 Superior Duck - "Daffy Duck" series; only time voiced by Eric Goldberg.
 Space Jam; voiced by Bob Bergen.

1998
 Quest for Camelot Sing-a-Longs (direct-to-video); voiced by Bob Bergen
 Looney Tunes Sing-a-Longs (direct-to-video); voiced by Bob Bergen.

2001
 Baby Looney Tunes (TV series; 2001–2006)

2002
 The 1st 13th Annual Fancy Anvil Awards Show Program Special: Live in Stereo (TV special); voiced by Jeff Bergman.

2003
 Cartoon Network's Funniest Bloopers and Other Embarrassing Moments (TV special); voiced by Jeff Bergman.
 Looney Tunes: Reality Check (direct-to-video); voiced by Bob Bergen.
 Looney Tunes: Stranger Than Fiction (direct-to-video); voiced by Bob Bergen.
 Duck Dodgers (TV series; 2003–2005); voiced by Bob Bergen, as The Eager Young Space Cadet
 Looney Tunes: Back in Action; voiced by Bob Bergen.

2004
 My Generation G...G...Gap - First "Porky" cartoon since 1951. Planned for theatrical release, but only released on Australian edition DVD of Looney Tunes: Back in Action. It was also released on Blu-ray and can be found on HBO Max. First and only time Porky was voiced by Billy West.

2006
 Porky and Daffy in the William Tell Overture; voiced by Jeff Bergman.
 Bah, Humduck! A Looney Tunes Christmas (direct-to-video); voiced by Bob Bergen.

2011
 The Looney Tunes Show (TV series; 2011–2014); voiced by Bob Bergen.

2015
 Looney Tunes: Rabbits Run (direct-to-video); voiced by Bob Bergen.
 Wabbit: A Looney Tunes Production (TV series; 2015–2020); voiced by Bob Bergen

2019
 Looney Tunes Cartoons (streaming series; 2019-present); voiced by Bob Bergen.

2021

 Teen Titans Go! See Space Jam, voiced by Bob Bergen via archive footage from Space Jam
 Space Jam: A New Legacy voiced by Eric Bauza

See also 
 The Bugs Bunny Show (1960-2000)

References

Sources

Porky Pig
 
Lists of animated films by character